Tasha Suri is a British fantasy author and former academic librarian. Her debut novel Empire of Sand (published in 2018) won Suri the Best Newcomer (Sydney J Bounds) Award at the 2019 British Fantasy Awards and was listed by Time Magazine as one of the 100 best fantasy books of all time in 2020. In 2022, her novel The Jasmine Throne won the World Fantasy Award for Best Novel.

Biography 
Suri was born in Harrow, London, to Punjabi parents; they often returned to India for vacations.

She studied English and Creative Writing at Warwick University. Formerly an academic librarian at Imperial College London, she is now a full-time writer.

Suri lives in London with her family, a cat, and two rabbits. She identifies as queer.

Bibliography

The Burning Kingdoms Trilogy 
 The Jasmine Throne, 2021 
 The Oleander Sword, 2022 
 The Burning Kingdoms III, 2024

The Books of Ambha Duology 
 Empire of Sand, 2018
 Realm of Ash, 2019

Young Adult 
 What Souls Are Made Of: A Wuthering Heights Remix, 2022

See also 
 List of fantasy authors
 List of LGBT authors

References

Further reading

External links 
 Official website
 Tasha Suri at the Internet Speculative Fiction Database

Year of birth missing (living people)
Living people
British fantasy writers